Puriyaadha Puthir is a 1990 Indian Tamil-language mystery thriller film written and directed by K. S. Ravikumar in his directorial debut. It is a remake of the 1989 Kannada film Tarka which was based on Agatha Christie's 1958 play, The Unexpected Guest. The film, produced by R. B. Choudary, was released on 7 September 1990.

Plot 
Raghu is a death sentenced prisoner who escapes from jail and hides in a bungalow. Luckily, the bungalow belongs to his college mate Geetha (Rekha). Raghu sees Geetha and requests her not to disclose about his whereabouts to police. When Raghu opens a wardrobe, he finds a dead body who happens to be Geetha's husband Chakravarthi (Raghuvaran). Raghu assumes that Geetha has murdered Chakravarthi. Geetha requests Raghu to help her dispose the dead body for which Raghu agrees. Raghu and Geetha take the dead body and dispose it in outskirts of the city. Now, they see a news that a flight in which Chakravarthi was about to travel from Chennai to Kolkata met with an accident leading to the death of all passengers. Geetha and Raghu take advantage of this situation and inform everyone that Chakravathi was dead in the plane crash.

Now, Geetha reveals her past to Raghu. She informs that Chakravarthi was a rich business man, however he was a sadist who had a hatred towards women which was due to the hardships he faced from his step mother during childhood days. Chakravarthi tortured Geetha in all the possible ways. Babu (Anand Babu) is a disco dancer and a very good friend of Geetha. Chakravarthi doubted whether Babu and Geetha had an illegitimate affair. One day, Babu visited Geetha's home when Chakravarthi was on a trip to Kolkata, however, Chakravarthi cancelled his trip and returned home. He got angered seeing Babu and Geetha together. Chakravarthi thrashed Babu which made Babu to run away from Chakravarthi's home. But to Geetha's surprise, Chakravarthi was lying dead after sometime in their home. Based on Geetha's confession, Raghu understands that it is not Geetha who has murdered Chakravarthi.

One day, Geetha gets a phone call from a stranger mentioning about her and Raghu's involvement in murder of Chakravarthi. The stranger wants Geetha to pay him a few lakhs of rupees else, he would inform this to the police. Geetha and Raghu suspect that Babu could be the stranger as he is only one who is aware that Chakravarthi did not take the flight to Kolkata. Meanwhile, Chakravarti's close friend also gets killed in a hotel during Babu's dance program. Geetha agrees to pay the ransom to the stranger and takes money with her. Raghu also accompanies Geetha. However, police arrive at the situation and arrests the stranger – who happens to be the Assistant Commissioner of Police (Delhi Ganesh). It is revealed that crime branch inspector Sarath (Sarath Kumar) was investigating this case as he had developed some doubts over Geetha when he saw Raghu with her. Sarath tapped Geetha's telephone and understood about the stranger threatening her for money.

Upon investigation, the ACP reveals that he spotted Raghu and Geetha in the city outskirts when they were disposing Chakravarthi's dead body and decided to extract money by threatening Geetha using this opportunity. The ACP gets arrested. Sarath arrests Geetha and Raghu. Babu is also arrested as he is a suspect too. Now, Raghu reveals that he is the murderer which shocks everyone. Raghu tells his past, where he was in love with Sindhu (Sithara) who was employed in Chakravarthi's firm a few years back. Chakravarthi along with his two other friends tried to rape Sindhu. Raghu rushed to the situation to save Sindhu and a fight ensues between Raghu and Chakravarthi. During the fight, Sindhu is killed by Chakravarthi and the blame is put upon Raghu which leads to his arrest.

Raghu escaped from prison coming in search of Chakravarthi and his two other friends who were responsible for Sindhu's death. Raghu had hidden in Chakravarthi's bungalow and killed him. Only after that he came to know that Geetha was married to Chakravarthi. However, Raghu decided to keep this as a secret and pretended to help Geetha in covering up the murder. Also, it was Raghu who killed Chakravarthi's friend in a hotel during Babu's dance program. Upon hearing this, Sarath understands that Geetha and Babu are innocent. Raghu says that he is still in search of one more friend of Chakravarthi was responsible for Sindhu's death. Raghu promises that he will not surrender unless he finds the person and kills him. Suddenly, Raghu jumps from the room window and escapes. The movie ends there signifying that Raghu is on a hunt for the third person.

Cast

Production 
The producer R. B. Choudary had remade the Kannada film Tarka (1989), based on Agatha Christie's 1958 play, The Unexpected Guest in Malayalam as Chodhyam; however, the remake remained unreleased, as he was not happy with the final cut. He later decided to remake Tarka in Tamil, and asked K. S. Ravikumar, then an assistant under Vikraman, to write the screenplay. Ravikumar completed the screenplay within a week, and later realised that Choudary had appointed him as the director. The film, Puriyaadha Pudhir, thus marked Ravikumar's directorial debut. R. Sarathkumar, who acted in the film, wore a belt around his neck while filming due to an accident he had before production began. Ravikumar finished the entire film in 29 days, saving the producer a lakh.

Soundtrack 
The music was composed by S. A. Rajkumar.

Release and reception 
Puriyaadha Pudhir was released on 7 September 1990. On 21 September, N. Krishnaswamy of The Indian Express wrote, "Puriyaadha Pudhir is a murder thriller that is interesting, and well made from Kodambakkam standards." Kalki appreciated Ravikumar for making his debut with a thriller. The critic felt despite filming a story which resembles pocket novel, the director's hardwork is visible throughout the film. The film underperformed at the box office, and Ravikumar later opted against directing offbeat, experimental films; instead he went on to identify with mainstream, blockbuster films.

References

Bibliography

External links 
 

1990 directorial debut films
1990 films
1990s mystery thriller films
1990s Tamil-language films
Films based on works by Agatha Christie
Films directed by K. S. Ravikumar
Films scored by S. A. Rajkumar
Indian mystery thriller films
Tamil remakes of Kannada films
Super Good Films films